1983 Football Championship of Ukrainian SSR was the 53rd season of association football competition of the Ukrainian SSR, which was part of the Soviet Second League in Zone 6. The season started on 25 March 1983.

The 1983 Football Championship of Ukrainian SSR was won by SKA Kiev. Qualified for the interzonal playoffs, the team from Kiev did not manage to gain promotion by placing last in its group.

The "Ruby Cup" of Molod Ukrayiny newspaper (for the most scored goals) was received by Kolos Mezhyrich.

Teams

Location map

Promoted teams 
 Nyva Berezhany – Champion of the Fitness clubs competitions (KFK) (debut)

Relegated teams 
 SKA Kiev – (Returning after 2 seasons)
 SKA Odessa – (Returning after 6 seasons)

Final standings

Top goalscorers 
The following were the top ten goalscorers.

See also 
 Soviet Second League

Notes

External links 
 1983 Soviet Second League, Zone 6 (Ukrainian SSR football championship). Luhansk football portal
 1983 Soviet championships (all leagues) at helmsoccer.narod.ru

1983
3
Soviet
Soviet
football
Football Championship of the Ukrainian SSR